Alberto Ginulfi (born 30 November 1941, in Rome) is a retired Italian professional footballer who played as a goalkeeper.

Career
Ginulfi played for 12 seasons (188 games) in the Serie A for Italian clubs A.S. Roma, Hellas Verona F.C., and ACF Fiorentina, winning titles with Roma.

He is one of the very few goalkeepers who can boast that he saved a penalty kick by Brazilian former footballer Pelé, who is widely regarded as one of the greatest footballer of all time. Ginulfi saved the penalty in a friendly match between Roma and Santos on 3 March 1972.

Style of play
Ginulfi was considered an extremely consistent and modern goalkeeper for his time.

Honours

Club
Roma
 Coppa Italia winner: 1963–64, 1968–69.
 Anglo-Italian Cup winner: 1971–72.

References

1941 births
Living people
Italian footballers
Serie A players
Serie B players
A.S. Roma players
Hellas Verona F.C. players
ACF Fiorentina players
U.S. Cremonese players
Association football goalkeepers